Xenochodaeus is a genus of sand-loving scarab beetles in the family Ochodaeidae. There are about 6 described species in Xenochodaeus.

Species
 X. americanus (Westwood, 1852)
 X. luscinus (Howden, 1968)
 X. musculus (Say, 1835)
 X. planifrons (Schaeffer, 1906)
 X. simplex (LeConte, 1854)
 X. ulkei (Horn, 1876)

References

Further reading

 Arnett, R.H. Jr., M. C. Thomas, P. E. Skelley and J. H. Frank. (eds.). (2002). American Beetles, Volume II: Polyphaga: Scarabaeoidea through Curculionoidea. CRC Press LLC, Boca Raton, FL.
 
 Richard E. White. (1983). Peterson Field Guides: Beetles. Houghton Mifflin Company.

Scarabaeoidea genera